Janet Louise Bauer Rungtramont Kukuk (October 2, 1942 – November 19, 2000) was an American politician.

Born in Saginaw, Michigan, Kukuk graduated from Central Michigan University in 1965. She worked in college administration and lived in Macomb Township, Macomb County, Michigan. She was involved with the Republican Party. Her husband Alvin H. Kukuk served in the Michigan Legislature. Kukuk served in the Michigan House of Representatives from 1999 until her death in 2000. Kukuk died from cancer.

Notes

1942 births
2000 deaths
People from Macomb County, Michigan
People from Saginaw, Michigan
Central Michigan University alumni
Women state legislators in Michigan
Republican Party members of the Michigan House of Representatives
Deaths from cancer in Michigan
20th-century American politicians
20th-century American women politicians